Sean Thompson Kleier (born 1987) is an American actor. He is primarily known for the role of Lex Von Weber in Odd Mom Out, Mikel in Happyish and appeared as Agent Stoltz in Ant-Man and the Wasp.

Biography
Kleier grew up in Louisville, Kentucky, and was educated there at Kentucky Country Day School. He further studied at Bowdoin College before moving to New York and doing improv with the Upright Citizens Brigade.

A co-founder of the production and media strategy company Motiv Creative, Kleier and his brother create content for political advocacy groups, particularly Represent.Us, a non-profit working on grassroots corruption, campaign finance and electoral reform.

Kleier played Agent Stoltz in the film Ant-Man and the Wasp (2018).

Filmography

References

External links

Living people
1987 births 
American male film actors
American male television actors
People from Louisville, Kentucky